

Events

January – Seven Rochester mobsters, including Frank D. Frassetto, are convicted in a federal court of racketeering crimes including several mob-related bombings. 
March 7 – Joseph Coppolino is stabbed to death and then decapitated, his headless corpse left on the street to be discovered by authorities. Coppolino was murdered by the DeMeo Crew, who suspected him of providing information about their marijuana trafficking operation to narcotics agents.

Arts and literature
Gloria (film) starring Gena Rowlands

Births

Deaths
March 21 – Angelo Bruno "The Gentle Don"/"The Docile Don", Philadelphia crime family boss
April 17 – Antonio Caponigro "Tony Bananas", Philadelphia crime family consigliere
April 17 – Alfred Salerno, Chauffeur and cousin of Antonio Caponigro
June 16 – Gerard Pappa, Colombo crime family associate and Genovese crime family soldier
July 11 – Gabriel Mannarino "Kelly", LaRocca crime family caporegime
September 19 – John Simone, Philadelphia crime family capo
October 30 – Frank Sindone, Philadelphia Crime family capo
December 16 – John McCullough, President of the Roofer's Union, Local 30 and an associate of Angelo Bruno

Notes

Organized crime
Years in organized crime